The ECAC Northeast was an intercollegiate athletic conference affiliated with the NCAA's Division III as a hockey-only conference. For many years it was one of the three men's hockey conferences that operated under the umbrella of the Eastern College Athletic Conference; the others were the ECAC East (now the New England Hockey Conference), and the ECAC West (soon to be the United Collegiate Hockey Conference). Member institutions were located in the New England region of the United States, in the states of Massachusetts and Rhode Island.

Unlike the ECAC East and ECAC West, there was no women's division of the ECAC Northeast. Most ECAC Northeast schools did not sponsor women's ice hockey; the two that did (Nichols & Salve Regina) played in the ECAC East.

The ECAC Northeast dissolved in 2016 when The Commonwealth Coast Conference, a Division III all-sports conference and the primary conference of most ECAC Northeast members, decided to sponsor men's ice hockey as a varsity sport. Becker, Johnson and Wales, and Suffolk joined the CCC as associate members for ice hockey, while CCC member University of New England moved their men's team from the ECAC East to play in the CCC league.

History
The foundation of the ECAC Northeast was laid in 1971 when ECAC 2, the college division of the ECAC created a third conference called ECAC 3. When the NCAA created Division III in 1973 ECAC 3 was placed at that level and remained there for the rest of its existence. In 1985, as a result of the NCAA beginning a Division III Tournament, ECAC 2 was reorganized into two separate conferences, ECAC East and ECAC West, with each becoming D-III leagues. To prevent confusion, ECAC 3 was renamed as ECAC North/South with all members split into North and South divisions (similar to how ECAC 2 had been divided into East and West divisions). This arrangement continued until 1992 when ECAC North/South was rearranged into three divisions (North, South and Central) and renamed ECAC North/South/Central. Over the course of the 1997–98 season the South Division lost 6 of its 8 teams, mostly to Division I, but rather than return to a two-division arrangement the league rebranded as ECAC Northeast. A year later the four member schools who were from Division II schools began playing in a separate tournament which allowed the other programs to play in an NCAA-sanctioned D-III conference tournament for the first time. As a result, ECAC Northeast got its first automatic bid to the tournament in 2000. In 2009 the nine schools whose primary conference was either MASCAC or Northeast-10 left when those two leagues began sponsoring ice hockey. The remaining teams stayed on for another seven years but in 2016 the Commonwealth Coast Conference, the primary conference for seven of the nine member teams, began sponsoring ice hockey. All nine teams joined CCC as either full or associate members and the ECAC Northeast was dissolved.

ECAC Northeast Tournament
Upon its founding, ECAC 3 instituted a tournament. Originally only a single game the championship slowly expanded along with the league.

Members
There were nine member schools as of the conference's final season in 2015–16.

† as of 2018

* Assumption, Franklin Pierce, Southern New Hampshire, and Stonehill are Division II schools; and were not allowed to participate in the ECAC Northeast playoffs after 1999, nor were they eligible for the Division III national tournament.

Membership timeline

References

NCAA Division III ice hockey conferences